Lyutibrod is a village in Mezdra Municipality in Vratsa Province, western Bulgaria. As of 2007 it has a population of 452. The village is situated in the northern end of the Iskar Gorge, on the right bank of the river of the same name. On the opposite bank of the river are the Ritlite rock formation and the Cherepish Monastery is located at several kilometers to the south. The former settlement Korites, abandoned in the 15th century, contain the ruins of four medieval churches, including a 5th-century basilica.

Honours
Lyutibrod Rocks in Antarctica are named after Lyutibrod.

Footnotes

Villages in Vratsa Province